Francisco Serrano Domínguez Cuenca y Pérez de Vargas, 1st Duke of la Torre, Grandee of Spain, Count of San Antonio (17 December 1810 – 25 November 1885) was a Spanish marshal and statesman. He was Prime Minister of Spain in 1868–69 and regent in 1869–70.

Early life and education
Serrano was born on 17 December 1810 in the Isla de León (current day San Fernando), in the Bay of Cádiz. He was son of Francisco Serrano y Cuenca and Isabel Domínguez de Guevara Vasconcelos. His father, born in Lopera, parish of Purísima Concepción, was a general officer and a Liberal. His mother was born in Marbella circa 1780.

Serrano began his studies at Vergara in the Basque provinces.

Military career
Following his father into the military, he became a cadet in 1822 in the Sagunto regiment, cornet in 1833 in the lancers of Sagunto, and passed into the carabiniers in 1829. When the Carlist agitation began in 1833, he transferred into the cuirassiers. He formed part of the escort that accompanied Don Carlos, the first pretender and brother of Ferdinand VII, to the frontier of Portugal.

As aide-de-camp of Espoz y Mina, then under the orders of generals Córdoba and Espartero, in the armies of Queen Isabella, Serrano took such an active part in the First Carlist War from 1834 to 1839, that he rose from the rank of captain to that of brigadier-general. He was awarded the Cross of San Fernando and many medals. He was also granted the 155th Grand Cross of the Order of the Tower and Sword.

In 1839, he was elected as a member of Cortes for the first time for Málaga. In 1840 he was promoted to the rank of general of division and commander of the district of Valencia, which he relinquished to take his seat in congress.

Political career

From that day Serrano became one of the chief military politicians of Spain. In 1841, he helped Espartero to overthrow the regency of Maria Christina of Bourbon-Sicily. In 1843, at Barcelona he made a pronunciamiento against Espartero. He was appointed as the minister of war in the cabinet of Joaquín María López y López, which convoked the Cortes that declared Queen Isabella of age at thirteen. He served in the same capacity in an Olozaga cabinet, sulked as long as the Moderates were in office.

In 1845, he was appointed as a senator, and in 1848 as captain-general of Granada. From 1846 to 1853, he was away from politics, living on his Andalusian estates or traveling abroad.

On 29 September 1850 in Madrid, Serrano married his first cousin, Antonia Domínguez y Borrell, Guevara y Lemus, 2nd Countess of San Antonio, with whom he had five children.

Serrano assisted Marshal Leopoldo O'Donnell in the military movements of 1854 and 1856, and was his staunch follower for twelve years.

Captain-General of Cuba 
O'Donnell appointed Serrano as marshal in 1856 and captain-general of Cuba from 1859 to 1862. Serrano governed that island with success, and helped carry out the war in Santo Domingo. He was the first viceroy to advocate political and financial reforms in the colony.

Return to the Peninsula 
On his return to Peninsular Spain, O'Donnell made him Duke of la Torre, Grandee of Spain of the first class, and the 139th Minister of Foreign Affairs, serving from 18 January to 2 March 1863.
Serrano risked his life in helping O'Donnell quell the insurrection of 22 June 1866 at Madrid. He was awarded with the Order of the Golden Fleece.

After the death of O'Donnell, Serrano became the leader of the Liberal Union Party. As president of the senate, he assisted Ríos Rosas to draw up a petition to Queen Isabella against her Moderate ministers, for which both were exiled.

The Glorious Revolution 

Serrano began to conspire with Antoine, Duke of Montpensier, Prim and Sagasta. On 7 July 1868, González Bravo had Serrano and other generals arrested and taken to the Canary Islands. There Serrano remained until Admiral Topete sent a steamer to bring him to Cadiz on 18 September that same year.

On landing he signed the manifesto of the revolution with Prim, Topete, Sagasta, Martos and others, and accepted the command of the revolutionary army. He routed the troops of Queen Isabella under the orders of the Marquess of Novaliches at the bridge of Alcolea. The queen fled to France, and Serrano, having entered Madrid, formed a Provisional Government.

1868–1871 Provisional Government 

In February 1869, he convoked the Cortes Constituyentes; he was appointed successively as president of the executive, Prime Minister of Spain, and Regent from 3 October 1868 to 18 June 1869. Serrano ruled impartially, respecting the independence of the Cortes and cabinets. He acceded to their selection of Amadeus I of Savoy as king, although he would have preferred Montpensier.

As soon as Amadeus reached Madrid, after the death of Prim, Serrano consented to form a coalition cabinet, which lasted only a few months. Serrano resigned and took the command of the Italian king's army against the Carlists in northern Spain.
He tried to form one more cabinet under King Amadeus as the 65th Prime Minister of Spain on 6 June 1872, but resigned on 12 June when that monarch declined to give his ministers dictatorial powers and sent for Ruiz Zorrilla. His mistakes led to Amadeus abdicating the throne on 11 February 1873.

Conspirations against the Republic 
Serrano opposed the federal republic, and conspired with other generals and politicians to overthrow it on 23 April 1873. Having failed, he went into exile in France. On the eve of his coup d'état of 3 January 1874 that sought to thwart the Federal Republic, the leading instigator, the General Pavía, sent for Serrano to take the leadership.

Dictatorship of Serrano 
Serrano again took the title of president of the executive; he tried to form a coalition cabinet, but Cristino Martos and Sagasta soon quarrelled. His next cabinet was presided over by Sagasta. The military and political unrest continued, and at the end of December 1874, the Bourbons were restored by another pronunciamiento.

During the eleven months he remained in office, Serrano devoted his attention chiefly to the reorganization of finance, the renewal of relations with American and European powers, and the suppression of revolt.

Later life 
After Alfonso XII ascended the throne in 1875, Serrano spent some time in France. He returned to Madrid in 1876, attended palace receptions, took his seat as a marshal in the senate, and flirted politically with Sagasta and his party in 1881. He finally gave his support to the formation of a dynastic Left with a democratic program defended by his nephew, General López Domínguez.

He died in Madrid on 25 November/26 November 1885, twenty-four hours after Alfonso XII, son of Isabella II, and purportedly, her husband and cousin Francis, although Alfonso's true biological paternity is uncertain.

Notes

References

Attribution:

Bibliography

External links

|-

|-

|-

|-

|-

|-

|-

|-

|-

|-

|-

|-

1810 births
1885 deaths
People from San Fernando, Cádiz
Ambassadors of Spain to France
Governors of Cuba
Spanish captain generals
Cuban nobility
101
Grandees of Spain
Knights of the Golden Fleece of Spain
Laureate Cross of Saint Ferdinand
Leaders of political parties in Spain
Liberal Union (Spain) politicians
Prime Ministers of Spain
Regents of Spain
Defence ministers of Spain
Viceroys of New Granada
19th-century South American people
Military personnel of the First Carlist War
Grand Masters of the Order of Isabella the Catholic
Presidents of the Senate of Spain
Presidents of the Executive Power of the First Spanish Republic
Spanish military personnel of the Third Carlist War (Governmental faction)